Mt. Pleasant Military Academy is a former military school established in 1814 to provide in Ossining, New York a school of the first order, where young men might be prepared for college, or for active business life, and where the influences thrown around the students should be such as to develop courteous and manly men. The academy closed sometime in the 1920s.

Founding
Money for the establishment of the school was raised through voluntary contributions from the people of Westchester County, New York and elsewhere. The first contribution was made on November 13, 1813, and up to August, 1831, the sum of $1,083.81 had been contributed.  It would seem, therefore, that almost from the start the school had been self-sustaining.  The first name on the list of contributors is that of Daniel D. Tompkins, Governor of the State of New York from 1807 to 1817 and Vice President of the United States from 1817 to 1825.

It was characteristic of the man that in the midst of his herculean tasks as defender of the State during the second war with England, he could find time to devote some attention to the little school at Mount Pleasant.  It is said of Tompkins that he "did more than the Federal Government for the success of the operations on the Canada–US border, pledging his personal and official credit when the New York banks refused to lend money on the security of the U.S. Treasury notes without his endorsement.  He advanced the means to maintain the military school at West Point, to continue the recruiting service in Connecticut, and to pay the workmen that were employed in the manufacture of arms at Springfield".  But he did not overlook the movement for better education in his native county.

19th-Century
There is scant record of the conduct of the school from 1814 to 1820, but on March 24 of that year an act was passed in the Legislature of New York, incorporating Mount Pleasant Academy and from that time on have been preserved full and complete records of the school.  The worthy aims of the school are quaintly set forth in an advertisement printed in the "New York Commercial Advertiser" for April 28, 1823, over the signature of General Aaron Ward, Secretary of the Board of Trustees and one of the original incorporators of the Academy.  General Ward says in part:  "In this Seminary the academic year will commence the 1st of May next.  The Trustees, therefore, respectfully beg leave to recommend it to the public, as an institution where youth are taught, by easy graduation, from the first rudiments of knowledge to the higher classics, sufficient to qualify them for admission into any of the American colleges, and more particularly for Columbia College, in the City of New York; or prepare them for the various stages of life.  The Academy is pleasantly situated on the banks of the Hudson, within 33 miles of the City of New York, in a healthy village, possessing many local advantages, among others a daily communication with the city, either by land or water; good medical advice, and the use of several churches."  Even today we need add little to these quaint words except possibly to say that daily communication with the city has been replaced by an hourly train service.  But the village boat still leaves its dock in the early morning, returning from the city with the lengthening shadows of evening.

In 1824 application was made to the Legislature for financing aid for the Academy and an act was passed on the 17th of November of that year providing a fund which ultimately netted the school about $1,200.

On the 3rd day of April, 1827, a new charter was granted to the Academy by the Regents of the University of the State of New York and under that charter the school is directly responsible to the Department of Education of the State and is subject to the supervision of that department.  The Principal is responsible to a Board of Trustees.

By 1830 the school had outgrown its accommodations and the trustees began to plan for greater things.  The old school property was sold and the land on which the school is now located was purchased.  Again subscriptions were called for and this time the sum of $3,356.10 was pledged by friends of the school.  In all, then, there was raised for the school, by voluntary contributions, $4,439.91, during the ninety-six years of its existence, and there was approved by the Legislature $1,200.  All other funds for improvement and development have been derived from the legitimate revenues resulting from the careful and businesslike management of the school throughout its existence of almost a century.  This record is unique and is one of which any school might be proud.

In 1833 the stone building, now known as Junior Hall, was erected, and it is interesting to know that the money for this building was loaned to the school by the Hon. William Jay, son of Chief Justice Jay, himself, as well, a great jurist, a public spirited citizen and one of the best known and most highly respected men of his day.

About this time a further, but unsuccessful, petition for assistance was made to the Legislature in which the following dignified and illuminating language was used: - "Your petitioners have, for a number of years past, been assiduously engaged in rearing and maintaining a literary institution that might essentially aid the cause of Literature and Science in our favored country.  Under the smiles of Providence, their academy has been rising and its pupils multiplying until the buildings heretofore occupied by the institution have become wholly inadequate to their comfortable accommodation."

So the school went on with varying fortune until, with the entrance of Mr. C.F. Maurice as Principal in 1845, it came to its own.  Mr. Maurice evidently was a rare man and he gave to the school a distinctive atmosphere that it retains to this day.

On March 1, 1860 Mr. Maurice withdrew, but was soon after elected a member of the Board of Trustees where he continued to serve the school faithfully and well for many years.  In 1860 Messrs. Benjamin and Phelps were chosen principals, the latter retiring in 1864.  In October 1867 we find the names of Stephen Gilman and J. Howe Allen associated with that of Major W.W. Benjamin as principals of the school.  Mr. Gilman was graduate of Harvard College, but his connection with Mount Pleasant ended in 1869 and the Associate Principalship of Messrs. Benjamin and Allen began, to continue until the death of the former in 1883.

Major Benjamin was a graduate of Norwich University and he proved himself to be an able disciplinarian and a successful man of business.  Mr. Allen graduated from Middlebury, was a man of scholarly attainments and of natural aptitude as a teacher.  He had, too, the ability to win and hold the confidence of boys.  The association, therefore, of these two men was a happy one for the school and under them Mount Pleasant continued to prosper.

From 1883 to 1894 Mr. Allen was sole principal, rounding out in 1894 a period of service extending over thirty-two years and covering a most prosperous period of the school's history.

From 1894 to 1895 Mr. Elijah Cook was the principal with Mr. Charles F. Brusie, formerly Professor of English in Kenyon College, as Associate.  In 1895 Mr. Brusie assumed the principalship, associating with him Mr. A.T. Emory, a former teacher at Mount Pleasant.  In 1902 Mr. Emory withdrew and since that time Mr. Brusie has been at the head of the school completing in June, 1914 a service of twenty years at Mount Pleasant Academy.

20th-Century
In 1913 Mr. Brusie associated with him Dr. Edward D. Graber who for six years had been principal of the High School at Greenwich, Conn., and under the management of these two gentlemen the school starts out on the second century of its existence.

During its hundred years of service Mount Pleasant Academy has kept pace with the advance of education, standing always for that which is permanent and substantial and opposed to the element in the educational world that is every crying for change, evidently thinking that all change must be progress.  Mount Pleasant has adhered to the old principle that true education, particularly for the secondary school, is about synonymous with mental development, and, therefore, for a boys' boarding school the question is not so much "what?" as "how".  In these days Mount Pleasant would probably qualify as a conservative progressive, holding on to the best of yesterday and not too eager to experiment with the possibilities of tomorrow, holding that these experiments belong to the laboratory of the university rather than to the secondary school where boys are trained to be men.

In material equipment Mount Pleasant has successfully met the demands of the times, providing all that is necessary to the comfort, safety and happiness of the growing boy, but teaching always simplicity of life and living.  Honesty, thoroughness, graciousness, real manliness are the watchwords at Mount Pleasant Academy, and the keynote of its teaching is "service".

What the educational world and the public generally think of Mount Pleasant's past and its outlook into the future can best be judged from the list of colleges and universities that thought it worth their while to be represented at this celebration, by the letters and telegrams received from men of culture and influence and by their expressions of approval printed on these pages.

Just to show the cordial spirit in which the colleges and universities co-operated with Mount Pleasant in its Centennial Celebration a few of the letters received [have been listed] below:
Armour Institute of Technology, Brown University, Colorado College, Columbia University, Johns Hopkins University, Cornell University, Dartmouth College, Harvard University, State University of Iowa, Lehigh University, Massachusetts Institute of Technology, Northwestern University, Oberlin College, University of Pennsylvania, Princeton University, University of the State of New York, New York University, Stevens Institute of Technology, Columbia Teachers College, University of Wisconsin, Yale University, William H. Taft, Office of the Mayor of New York City, and the Adjutant General of the State of New York."

Mount Pleasant Hall, or Mr. Brusie's School for Young Boys, adjoined the Mount Pleasant Academy grounds on the north for some number of years.  The property was the birthplace of New York Governor J.T. Hoffman and was sold by him to the school.  Boys of "good character" under thirteen were accepted here for Forms 1 through 5.  In 1909 the Hall had 24 students.

As of 2020 the only surviving structure is the former library building, located at 23 State Street.

References

 Quoting from the Centennial 1914 yearbook of the Academy, the section entitled Historical Sketch, which is in the Public Domain.

Defunct United States military academies
1814 establishments in New York (state)
Educational institutions established in 1814
Ossining, New York
Education in Westchester County, New York